Datuk Muhammad bin Abdullah (Jawi: محمد بن عبدﷲ; born 1943) is a Malaysian politician of the United Malays National Organisation (UMNO), member of the Barisan National (BN). He was served as Deputy Speaker of the Dewan Rakyat from 1999 to 2004.

Election results

Honours

Honours of Malaysia
  :
  Commander of the Order of Meritorious Service (PJN) - Datuk (2003)
  :
  Knight Companion of the Order of the Crown of Pahang (DIMP) – Dato' (1991)

References

Living people
1943 births
People from Pahang
Malaysian people of Malay descent
Members of the Dewan Rakyat
United Malays National Organisation politicians